Line S1 of the Beijing Subway is a medium-low speed maglev line. It is operated by the Beijing Mass Transit Railway Operation Corporation Limited. The line was opened on 30 December 2017.

Description

Six-coach maglev trains were built by the Tangshan Railway Vehicle, a subsidiary of CRRC. It is China's 3rd commercial maglev train in operation. Line S1 is part of Beijing's attempts to tackle environmental problems caused by heavy car use, coal burning and fast urbanization by upgrading its urban rail systems.

The Line S1 designation is a holdover from a defunct plan to build several suburban railway lines in Beijing. Line S1 was envisioned to reuse the Jingmen Railway connecting  station to Mentougou District. That plan was abandoned and the section between Pingguoyuan and Cishousi stations was replaced with Phase 3 of Line 6, and the other section was replaced with today's Maglev S1 Line.

History

When the Line S1 originally opened in 2017, it was not connected to the rest of the subway network. With the opening of Line 6 Phase 3 on 30 December 2018, passengers can transfer to Line 6 at Jin'anqiao.

In July 2021, a major bridge was completed, and the opening of the extension to Pingguoyuan planned for the end of the year. The extension opened on December 31, 2021.

Stations

References

External links 

Beijing Subway lines
Maglev
Railway lines opened in 2017
2017 establishments in China
Monorails in China
1500 V DC railway electrification